Hyphessobrycon brumado is a species of tetra fish belonging to the family characidae, inhabiting South American river of Rio Brumado and the Rio de Contas drainage.

Description
Hyphessobrycon brumado is a long, slender fish, similar to many of its kin. Its body is yellow-orange in color and has a blurred black stripe running down its lateral line. This stripe thickens and becomes less blurred at the tail; more apparent on males.

References

Characidae
Tetras
Fish described in 2010